Uzbekistan competed at the 2020 Summer Olympics in Tokyo. Originally scheduled to take place from 24 July to 9 August 2020, the Games were postponed to 23 July to 8 August 2021, due to the COVID-19 pandemic. It was the nation's seventh consecutive appearance at the Summer Olympics in the post-Soviet era.

Uzbekistan won five medals at these Games, down from 13 in 2016. However, the country won three gold medals, only one gold medal less than in Rio.

Medalists

Competitors
The following is the list of number of competitors participating in the Games:

Athletics

Uzbek athletes further achieved the entry standards, either by qualifying time or by world ranking, in the following track and field events (up to a maximum of 3 athletes in each event):

Field events

Combined events – Women's heptathlon

Boxing 

Uzbekistan entered eleven boxers (eight men and three women) into the Olympic tournament. 2019 world medalists Mirazizbek Mirzakhalilov (men's featherweight), Bobo-Usmon Baturov (men's welterweight), and reigning super heavyweight champion Bakhodir Jalolov, two-time Asian medalist Elnur Abduraimov, and rookies Sanjar Tursunov (men's heavyweight) and Tursunoy Rakhimova (women's flyweight), with Shakhobidin Zoirov looking to defend his men's flyweight title for his second Games, secured the spots on the Uzbek squad in their respective weight divisions, either by advancing to the semifinal match or by scoring a box-off triumph at the 2020 Asia & Oceania Qualification Tournament in Amman, Jordan.

Fanat Kakhramonov (men's middleweight), 2019 world silver medalist Dilshodbek Ruzmetov (men's light heavyweight), Raykhona Kodirova (women's lightweight), and Maftunakhton Melieva (women's middleweight) completed the nation's boxing lineup by topping the list of eligible boxers from Asia and Oceania in their respective weight divisions of the IOC's Boxing Task Force Rankings. Melieva was later replaced by Shakhnova Yunusova. With 11 successful entrants, Uzbekistan has the largest number of qualified boxers at the Games, shared with Great Britain. Uzbekistan won one gold medal by Bakhodir Jalolov.

Men

Women

Canoeing

Sprint
Uzbekistan qualified a single boat in the women's C-2 500 m for the Games by finishing fifth in the final race at the 2019 ICF Canoe Sprint World Championships in Szeged, Hungary.

Qualification Legend: FA = Qualify to final (medal); FB = Qualify to final B (non-medal)

Cycling

Road
Uzbekistan entered one rider to compete in the men's Olympic road race by their finish in the top two not yet qualified at the 2019 Asian Championships in Tashkent. An additional spot was awarded to the Uzbekistani cyclist in the women's road race by virtue of her top 100 individual finish in the UCI World Ranking.

Fencing

Uzbekistan entered three fencers into the Olympic competition for the first time since 2012. Malika Khakimova claimed a spot in the women's épée as one of the two highest-ranked fencers vying for qualification from Asia and Oceania in the FIE Adjusted Official Rankings. Sherzod Mamutov (men's sabre) and Zaynab Dayibekova (women's sabre) rounded out the Uzbek roster as the sole winners of their respective individual events at the Asia and Oceania Zonal Qualifier in Tashkent.

Gymnastics

Artistic
Uzbekistan entered two artistic gymnasts into the Olympic competition. Rasuljon Abdurakhimov and seven-time Olympian Oksana Chusovitina received a spare berth each in the men's and women's apparatus events, as one of the highest-ranked gymnasts, who were neither part of the team, nor qualified directly through the all-around, at the 2019 World Championships in Stuttgart, Germany.

Men

Women

Rhythmic
Uzbekistan fielded a squad of rhythmic gymnasts. Sabina Tashkenbaeva secured an individual spot to the Olympics during the 2021 World Cup series by being the second highest-ranked eligible gymnast. Uzbekistan qualified a group spot at the 2021 Asian Rhythmic Gymnastics Championships.

Judo
 
Uzbekistan entered 10 judoka into the Olympic tournament based on the International Judo Federation Olympics Individual Ranking.

Men

Women

Mixed

Modern pentathlon
 
Uzbek athletes qualified for the following spots to compete in modern pentathlon for the first time in history. Alexander Savkin and Alise Fakhrutdinova confirmed places each in the men's and women's event, respectively, with the former finishing fifth and the latter third among those eligible for Olympic qualification at the 2019 Asia & Oceania Championships in Kunming, China.

Rowing

Uzbekistan qualified one boat in the men's lightweight double sculls for the Games by winning the bronze medal and securing the second of three berths available at the 2021 FISA Asia & Oceania Olympic Qualification Regatta in Tokyo, Japan.

Qualification Legend: FA=Final A (medal); FB=Final B (non-medal); FC=Final C (non-medal); FD=Final D (non-medal); FE=Final E (non-medal); FF=Final F (non-medal); SA/B=Semifinals A/B; SC/D=Semifinals C/D; SE/F=Semifinals E/F; QF=Quarterfinals; R=Repechage

Shooting

Uzbekistan entered one shooter at the games, after getting the allocation quotas.

Swimming 
 
Uzbek swimmers further achieved qualifying standards in the following events (up to a maximum of 2 swimmers in each event at the Olympic Qualifying Time (OQT), and potentially 1 at the Olympic Selection Time (OST)):

However, FINA accused and condemned Uzbekistan federation of cheating on their times.

Taekwondo

Uzbekistan entered four athletes into the Taekwondo competition at the Games. Rio 2016 Olympian Nikita Rafalovich qualified directly for the second time in the men's welterweight category (80 kg) by finishing among the top five Taekwondo practitioners at the end of the WT Olympic Rankings. Ulugbek Rashitov (men's 68 kg), Rafalovich's fellow Olympian Nigora Tursunkulova (women's 67 kg), and 2018 Asian Games bronze medalist Svetlana Osipova (women's +67 kg) secured the spots on the Uzbek Taekwondo squad with a top two finish each in their respective weight classes at the 2021 Asian Qualification Tournament in Amman, Jordan.

Tennis

Uzbekistan entered one tennis player into the Olympic tournament. Two-time Olympian Denis Istomin secured the outright berth by winning the men's singles title at the 2018 Asian Games in Jakarta.

Weightlifting

Uzbek weightlifters qualified for four quota places at the games, based on the Tokyo 2020 Rankings Qualification List of 11 June 2021.

Wrestling

Uzbekistan qualified eight wrestlers for each of the following classes in the Olympic competition. Three of them finished among the top six to book Olympic spots in the men's Greco-Roman (60, 77, and 87 kg) at the 2019 World Championships, while five additional licenses were awarded to the Uzbek wrestlers who progressed to the top two finals of their respective weight categories at the 2021 Asian Qualification Tournament in Almaty, Kazakhstan.

Freestyle

Greco-Roman

See also
 Uzbekistan at the 2020 Summer Paralympics

References

Nations at the 2020 Summer Olympics
2020
2021 in Uzbekistani sport